Konstantina Birbili (born 1969), commonly known as Tina Birbili, was the Minister for the Environment, Energy and Climate Change of Greece until June 17, 2011. Birbili was the first holder of this office, which was created to succeed the former Ministry for the Environment, Physical Planning and Public Works by Greek prime minister George Papandreou in October 2009.

Career
Birbili had no prior government experience on her appointment, but she had worked as an advisor to prime minister Papandreou during his tenure at the foreign ministry. She was regarded as a strong advocate for environmental issues within the Panhellenic Socialist Movement party.

A physicist by training, Birbili attended the University of Athens and London's Imperial College, obtaining a PhD in 1995.

See also
 List of ministers of climate change
 List of ministers of the environment

References

External links 

1969 births
Living people
Government ministers of Greece
Environment ministers of Greece
Energy ministers
National and Kapodistrian University of Athens alumni
Alumni of Imperial College London
Politicians from Athens